American Income Life Insurance Company  (formerly NASDAQ: AINC), based in Waco, Texas, is an insurance company that provides supplemental life insurance to labor unions, credit unions, and associations. American Income Life (AIL) was founded in 1951. The company's executive offices have been located in Waco, Texas, since 1959. American Income Life is licensed in 49 states, the District of Columbia, Canada, and is registered to carry on business in New Zealand. AIL also has two wholly owned subsidiaries: National Income Life Insurance Company, licensed in the state of New York, and Union Heritage Life Assurance Company Limited, licensed in the Republic of Ireland.

AIL had more than two million policyholders (as of June 2013) and is a wholly owned subsidiary of Globe Life (NYSE: GL), based in McKinney, Texas.

History
The company's history began in 1951 under the name American Income. American Income was chartered as a mutual assessment association in Indiana with $25,000 of borrowed capital. It was reinsured through American Standard Insurance Company as a new mutual reserve company in March 1951. American Income Insurance Company was officially founded in May 1951 by the company's president, Harold Goodman, and executive vice president, Bernard Rapoport (Goodman's nephew). The company's home offices were located in Indianapolis, Indiana.

In 1961, AIL began providing supplemental insurance to members of labor unions and serving union policyholders in ways unfamiliar to the industry. For example, AIL waived payment of premiums by union members during an authorized strike action, a benefit still offered in 2021. AIL also developed a college scholarship program for children of union members, and the company contributed to the strike funds of unions engaged in lawful strikes. The company was positioned as the only 100% union insurance company, and termed the phrase, “Be Union-Buy Union." In 1963, AIL's income was about $6 or $7 million.

In 1994, American Income Life was sold to Torchmark Corporation for $563 million.

in 2012, American Income Life Insurance Co. sued Google, Inc. and the unnamed owners of two websites for featuring unflattering results and reviews for the company in the top page of search results.

As part of a company-wide rebranding of the Torchmark Corporation, American Income Life became a subsidiary of Globe Life on August 8, 2019

References

Life insurance companies of the United States
Companies based in Waco, Texas
Financial services companies established in 1951
1951 establishments in Texas
Globe Life Subsidiaries
Insurance companies based in Texas